Hemiceratoides hieroglyphica is a moth from Madagascar. It was discovered in 2006 that it frequents sleeping birds at night, and drinks their tears, using a specialized, harpoon-like proboscis. Tear-feeding moths outside of Madagascar (for example Mecistoptera griseifusa in the Hypeninae subfamily), are not directly related to this species, and have evolved dissimilar mechanisms for drinking from large animals like deer or crocodiles.

The adults have a wingspan of 52 mm.

Distribution
This species is known from Nigeria, South Africa and Madagascar.

References
 Malagasy birds as hosts for eye-frequenting moths. Biology Letters 
 New Scientist: Moths drink the tears of sleeping birds (December 2006)
 www.ncbi.nlm.nih.gov Malagasy birds as hosts for eye-frequenting moths
 Harris, Thomas. The Silence of the Lambs. New York: St. Martin's, 1988.

Notes

Calpinae
Moths described in 1891
Moths of Madagascar
Moths of Africa